Playboy is an American men's lifestyle and entertainment magazine, formerly in print and currently online. It was founded in Chicago in 1953, by Hugh Hefner and his associates, and funded in part by a $1,000 loan from Hefner's mother. 

Known for its centerfolds of nude and semi-nude models (Playmates), Playboy played an important role in the sexual revolution and remains one of the world's best-known brands, having grown into Playboy Enterprises, Inc. (PEI), with a presence in nearly every medium. In addition to the flagship magazine in the United States, special nation-specific versions of Playboy are published worldwide, including those by licensees, such as Dirk Steenekamp's DHS Media Group.

The magazine has a long history of publishing short stories by novelists such as Arthur C. Clarke, Ian Fleming, Vladimir Nabokov, Saul Bellow, Chuck Palahniuk, P. G. Wodehouse, Roald Dahl, Haruki Murakami, and Margaret Atwood. With a regular display of full-page color cartoons, it became a showcase for  cartoonists such as Harvey Kurtzman, Jack Cole, Eldon Dedini, Jules Feiffer, Shel Silverstein, Erich Sokol, Roy Raymonde, Gahan Wilson, and Rowland B. Wilson. 

Playboy features monthly interviews of public figures, such as artists, architects, economists, composers, conductors, film directors, journalists, novelists, playwrights, religious figures, politicians, athletes, and race car drivers. The magazine generally reflects a liberal editorial stance, although it often interviews conservative celebrities.

After a year-long removal of most nude photos in Playboy magazine, the March–April 2017 issue brought back nudity.

Publication history

1950s

By spring 1953, Hugh Hefner—a 1949 University of Illinois psychology graduate who had worked in Chicago for Esquire magazine writing promotional copy; Publisher's Development Corporation in sales and marketing; and Children's Activities magazine as circulation promotions manager—had planned out the elements of his own magazine, that he would call Stag Party. He formed HMH Publishing Corporation, and recruited his friend Eldon Sellers to find investors. Hefner eventually raised just over $8,000, including from his brother and mother. However, the publisher of an unrelated men's adventure magazine, Stag, contacted Hefner and informed him it would file suit to protect their trademark if he were to launch his magazine with that name. Hefner, his wife Millie, and Sellers met to seek a new name, considering "Top Hat", "Gentleman", "Sir'", "Satyr", "Pan" and "Bachelor" before Sellers suggested "Playboy".

The first issue, in December 1953, was undated, as Hefner was unsure there would be a second. He produced it in his Hyde Park kitchen. The first centerfold was Marilyn Monroe, although the picture used originally was taken for a calendar rather than for Playboy. Hefner chose what he deemed the "sexiest" image, a previously unused nude study of Marilyn stretched with an upraised arm on a red velvet background with closed eyes and mouth open. The heavy promotion centered around Marilyn's nudity on the already-famous calendar, together with the teasers in marketing, made the new Playboy magazine a success.
The first issue sold out in weeks. Known circulation was 53,991. The cover price was 50¢. Copies of the first issue in mint to near-mint condition sold for over $5,000 in 2002.

The novel Fahrenheit 451, by Ray Bradbury, was published in 1953 and serialized in the March, April and May 1954 issues of Playboy.

An urban legend started about Hefner and the Playmate of the Month because of markings on the front covers of the magazine. From 1955 to 1979 (except for a six-month gap in 1976), the "P" in Playboy had stars printed in or around the letter. Urban legend stated that this was either a rating that Hefner gave to the Playmate according to how attractive she was, the number of times that Hefner had slept with her, or how good she was in bed. In actuality, stars, between zero and 12 indicated the domestic or international advertising region for that printing.

1960s–1990s

In the 1960s, the magazine added "The Playboy Philosophy" column. Early topics included LGBTQ rights, women's rights, censorship, and the First Amendment. Playboy was an early proponent of cannabis reform and provided founding support to the National Organization for the Reform of Marijuana Laws in 1970.

From 1966 to 1976, Robie Macauley was the fiction editor at Playboy. During this period the magazine published fiction by Saul Bellow, Seán Ó Faoláin, John Updike, James Dickey, John Cheever, Doris Lessing, Joyce Carol Oates, Vladimir Nabokov, Michael Crichton, John le Carré, Irwin Shaw, Jean Shepherd, Arthur Koestler, Isaac Bashevis Singer, Bernard Malamud, John Irving, Anne Sexton, Nadine Gordimer, Kurt Vonnegut and J. P. Donleavy, as well as poetry by Yevgeny Yevtushenko.

In 1968, at the feminist Miss America protest, symbolically feminine products were thrown into a "Freedom Trash Can". These included copies of Playboy and Cosmopolitan magazines. One of the key pamphlets produced by the protesters was "No More Miss America!", by Robin Morgan, which listed 10 characteristics of the Miss America pageant that the authors believed degraded women; it compared the pageant to Playboys centerfold as sisters under the skin, describing this as "The Unbeatable Madonna–Whore Combination".

Macauley contributed all of the popular Ribald Classics series published between January 1978 and March 1984.

After reaching its peak in the 1970s, Playboy saw a decline in circulation and cultural relevance due to competition in the field it founded—first from Penthouse, then from Oui (which was published as a spin-off of Playboy) and Gallery in the 1970s; later from pornographic videos; and more recently from lad mags such as Maxim, FHM, and Stuff. In response, Playboy attempted to re-assert its hold on the 18–35-year-old male demographic through slight changes to content and focusing on issues and personalities more appropriate to its audience—such as hip-hop artists being featured in the "Playboy Interview".

Christie Hefner, daughter of founder Hugh Hefner, joined Playboy in 1975 and became head of the company in 1988. She announced in December 2008 that she would be stepping down from leading the company, effective in January 2009, and said that the election of Barack Obama as the next President had inspired her to give more time to charitable work, and that the decision to step down was her own. "Just as this country is embracing change in the form of new leadership, I have decided that now is the time to make changes in my own life as well", she said. Hefner was succeeded by company director and media veteran Jerome H. Kern as interim CEO, who was in turn succeeded by publisher Scott Flanders.

2000–present
The magazine celebrated its 50th anniversary with the January 2004 issue. Celebrations were held at Las Vegas, Los Angeles, New York, and Moscow during the year to commemorate this event. Playboy also launched limited-edition products designed by fashion houses such as Versace, Vivienne Westwood and Sean John. As a homage to the magazine's 50th anniversary, MAC Cosmetics released two limited-edition products, namely a lipstick and a glitter cream.

The printed magazine ran several annual features and ratings. One of the most popular was its annual ranking of the top "party schools" among all U.S. universities and colleges. In 2009, the magazine used five criteria: bikini, brains, campus, sex and sports in the development of its list. The top-ranked party school by Playboy for 2009 was the University of Miami.

In June 2009, the magazine reduced its publication schedule to 11 issues per year, with a combined July/August issue. On August 11, 2009, London's Daily Telegraph newspaper reported that Hugh Hefner had sold his English manor house (next door to the Playboy Mansion in Los Angeles) for $18 m ($10 m less than the reported asking price) to another American, Daren Metropoulos, the President and co-owner of Pabst Blue Ribbon, and that due to significant losses in the company's value (down from $1 billion in 2000 to $84 million in 2009), the Playboy publishing empire was for sale for $300 million. In December 2009, the publication schedule was reduced to 10 issues per year, with a combined January/February issue.

On July 12, 2010, Playboy Enterprises Inc. announced Hefner's $5.50 per share offer ($122.5 million based on shares outstanding on April 30 and the closing price on July 9) to buy the portion of the company he did not already own and take the company private with the help of Rizvi Traverse Management LLC. The company derived much of its income from licensing, rather than from the magazine. On July 15, Penthouse owner FriendFinder Networks Inc. offered $210 million (the company is valued at $185 million), though Hefner, who already owned 70 percent of voting stock, did not want to sell.  In January 2011, the publisher of Playboy magazine agreed to an offer by Hefner to take the company private for $6.15 per share, an 18 percent premium over the price of the last previous day of trading. The buyout was completed in March 2011.

20162018 changes and brief ending of full-frontal nudity

In October 2015, Playboy announced the magazine would no longer feature full-frontal nudity beginning with the March 2016 issue. Company CEO Scott Flanders acknowledged the magazine's inability to compete with freely available internet pornography and nudity; according to him, "You're now one click away from every sex act imaginable for free. And so it's just passé at this juncture". Hefner agreed with the decision. The redesigned Playboy, however, would still feature a Playmate of the Month and pictures of women, but they would be rated as not appropriate for children under 13. The move would not affect PlayboyPlus.com (which features nudity at a paid subscription). Josh Horwitz of Quartz argued that the motivation for the decision to remove nudity from the magazine was to give Playboy Licensing a less inappropriate image in India and China, where the brand is a popular item on apparel and thus generates significant revenue.

Among other changes to the magazine included ending the popular jokes section and the various cartoons that appeared throughout the magazine. The redesign eliminated the use of jump copy (articles continuing on non-consecutive pages), which in turn eliminated most of the space for cartoons. Hefner, himself a former cartoonist, reportedly resisted dropping the cartoons more than the nudity, but ultimately obliged. Playboys plans were to market itself as a competitor to Vanity Fair, as opposed to more traditional competitors GQ and Maxim.

Playboy announced in February 2017, however, that the dropping of nudity had been a mistake and furthermore, for its March/April issue, reestablished some of its franchises, including the Playboy Philosophy and Party Jokes, but dropped the subtitle "Entertainment for Men", inasmuch as gender roles have evolved. The announcement was made by the company's chief creative officer on Twitter with the hashtag #NakedIsNormal.

In early 2018, and according to Jim Puzzanghera of the Los Angeles Times, Playboy was reportedly "considering killing the print magazine", as the publication "has lost as much as $7 million annually in recent years". However, in the July/August 2018 issue a reader asked if the print magazine would discontinue, and Playboy responded that it was not going anywhere.

Following Hefner's death, and his family's financial stake in the company, the magazine changed direction. In 2019, Playboy was relaunched as a quarterly publication without adverts. Topics covered included an interview with Tarana Burke, a profile of Pete Buttigieg, coverage of BDSM and a cover photo representing gender and sexual fluidity.

Online-only
In March 2020, Ben Kohn, CEO of Playboy Enterprises, announced that the Spring 2020 issue would be the last regularly scheduled printed issue and that the magazine would now publish its content online. The decision to close the print edition was attributed in part to the COVID-19 pandemic which interfered with distribution of the magazine.

Publicly traded 
In autumn 2020, Playboy announced a reverse merger deal with Mountain Crest Acquisition Corp.—a special purpose acquisition company (SPAC). In February 2021, the stock of a combined company, PLBY Group, began trading on the Nasdaq exchange as “PLBY.”

Circulation history and statistics
In 1971, Playboy had a circulation rate base of seven million, which was its high point. The best-selling individual issue was the November 1972 edition, which sold 7,161,561 copies. One-quarter of all American college men were buying or subscribing to the magazine every month. On the cover was model Pam Rawlings, photographed by Rowland Scherman.  Perhaps coincidentally, a cropped image of the issue's centerfold (which featured Lena Söderberg) became a de facto standard image for testing image processing algorithms. It is known simply as the "Lenna" (also "Lena") image in that field.  In 1972, Playboy was the ninth highest circulation magazine in the United States.

The 1975 average circulation was 5.6 million; by 1981 it was 5.2 million, and by 1982 down to 4.9 million. Its decline continued in later decades, and reached about 800,000 copies per issue in late 2015, and 400,000 copies by December 2017. 

In 1970, Playboy became the first gentleman's magazine to be printed in braille. It is also one of the few magazines whose microfilm format was in color, not black and white.

Features and format

Rabbit logo

Playboys enduring mascot, a stylized silhouette of a rabbit wearing a tuxedo bow tie, was created by Playboy art director Art Paul for the second issue as an endnote, but was adopted as the official logo and has appeared ever since. A running joke in the magazine involves hiding the logo somewhere in the cover art or photograph. Hefner said he chose the rabbit for its "humorous sexual connotation", and because the image was "frisky and playful". In an interview Hefner explained his choice of a rabbit as Playboys logo to the Italian journalist Oriana Fallaci:

The jaunty rabbit quickly became a popular symbol of extroverted male culture, becoming a lucrative source of merchandizing revenue for the company. In the 1950s, it was adopted as the military aircraft insignia for the Navy's VX-4 fighter-evaluation squadron.

The Playboy Interview
Besides its centerfold, a major part of Playboy for much of its existence has been the Playboy Interview, an extensive (usually several thousand-word) discussion between a publicly known individual and an interviewer. Writer Alex Haley served as a Playboy interviewer on a few occasions; one of his interviews was with Martin Luther King Jr.; he also interviewed Malcolm X and American Nazi Party founder George Lincoln Rockwell. The magazine interviewed then-presidential candidate Jimmy Carter in the November 1976 issue, in which he stated "I've committed adultery in my heart many times." David Sheff's interview with John Lennon and Yoko Ono appeared in the January 1981 issue, which was on newsstands at the time of Lennon's murder; the interview was later published in book format.

Another interview-type section, entitled "20Q" (a play on the game of Twenty Questions), was added in October 1978. Cheryl Tiegs was the first interviewee for the section.

Rock the Rabbit
"Rock the Rabbit" was an annual music news and pictorial feature published in the March edition. The pictorial featured images of rock bands photographed by music photographer Mick Rock. Fashion designers participated in the Rock the Rabbit event by designing T-shirts inspired by Playboys rabbit head logo for each band. The shirts were sold at Playboys retailers and auctioned off to raise money for AIDS research and treatment at LIFEbeat: The Music Industry Fights AIDS. Bands who were featured include: MGMT, Daft Punk, Iggy Pop, Duran Duran, Flaming Lips, Snow Patrol, and The Killers.

Photographers
The photographers who have contributed to Playboy include Ken Marcus, Richard Fegley, Arny Freytag, Ron Harris, Tom Kelley, David Mecey, Russ Meyer, Pompeo Posar, Suze Randall, Herb Ritts, Stephen Wayda, Sam Wu, Mario Casilli, Ana Dias, Ellen von Unwerth, Annie Leibovitz, Helmut Newton, and Bunny Yeager.

Celebrities

Many celebrities (singers, actresses, models, etc.) have posed for Playboy over the years. This list is only a small portion of those who have posed. Some of them are:

Film:

 Jayne Mansfield (February 1955)
 Mara Corday (October 1958)
 Ursula Andress (June 1965)
 Carol Lynley (March 1965) 
 Margot Kidder (March 1975)
 Kim Basinger (February 1983)
 Terry Moore (August 1984)
 Janet Jones (March 1987)
 Drew Barrymore (January 1995)
 Denise Richards (December 2004)
 Sasha Grey (October 2010)

Music:

 La Toya Jackson (March 1989/Nov 1991)
 Fem2Fem (December 1993)
 Nancy Sinatra (May 1995)
 Samantha Fox (October 1996)
 Joey Heatherton (April 1997)
 Linda Brava (April 1998)
 Belinda Carlisle (August 2001)
 Tiffany (April 2002)
 Carnie Wilson (August 2003)
 Debbie Gibson (March 2005)Sports:

 Svetlana Khorkina (November 1997 Russian edition)
 Katarina Witt (December 1998)
 Tanja Szewczenko (April 1999 German edition)
 Joanie Laurer (November 2000 and January 2002)
 Gabrielle Reece (January 2001)
 Kiana Tom (May 2002)
 Torrie Wilson (May 2003 and March 2004 [the latter with Sable])
 Amy Acuff (September 2004)
 Amanda Beard (July 2007)
 Ashley Harkleroad (August 2008)

Television:

 Linda Evans (July 1971)
 Suzanne Somers (February 1980 and December 1984)
 Teri Copley (November 1990)
 Dian Parkinson (December 1991 and May 1993)
 Shannen Doherty (March 1994 and December 2003)
 Farrah Fawcett (December 1995 and July 1997)
 Claudia Christian (October 1999)
 Shari Belafonte (September 2000)
 Brooke Burke (May 2001 and November 2004)
 Karina Smirnoff (May 2011)

Other editions

Playboy Special Editions

The success of Playboy magazine has led PEI to market other versions of the magazine, the Special Editions (formerly called Newsstand Specials), such as Playboy's College Girls and Playboy's Book of Lingerie, as well as the Playboy video collection.

Braille
The National Library Service for the Blind and Physically Handicapped (NLS) has published a braille edition of Playboy since 1970. The braille version includes all the written words in the non-braille magazine, but no pictorial representations. Congress cut off funding for the braille magazine translation in 1985, but U.S. District Court Judge Thomas Hogan reversed the decision on First Amendment grounds.

International editions

Current

Former

Online
The growth of the Internet prompted the magazine to develop an official internet presence called Playboy Online in the late 1980s. The company launched Playboy.com, the official website for Playboy Enterprises and an online companion to Playboy magazine, in 1994. As part of the online presence, Playboy developed a pay web site called the Playboy Cyber Club in 1995 which features online chats, additional pictorials, videos of Playmates and Playboy Cyber Girls that are not featured in the magazine. Archives of past Playboy articles and interviews are also included. In September 2005, Playboy began publishing a digital version of the magazine.

In 2010, Playboy introduced The Smoking Jacket, a safe-for-work website designed to appeal to young men, while avoiding nude images or key words that would cause the site to be filtered or otherwise prohibited in the workplace.

In May 2011, Playboy introduced iplayboy.com, a complete, uncensored version of its near-700 issue archive, targeting the Apple iPad.  By launching the archive as a web app, Playboy was able to circumvent both Apple's App Store content restrictions and their 30% subscription fee.

Litigation and legal issues

Stacy Arthur, Playboy's Playmate of the Month for January, 1991, filed a $70 million lawsuit against Playboy Enterprises Inc. and others alleging she was raped and sodomized by three Playboy employees on October 6, 1991, at the Playboy mansion in Los Angeles and that inaction by the magazine led to the death of her husband.

On January 14, 2004, the Ninth Circuit U.S. Court of Appeals ruled that Playboy Enterprises Inc.'s trademark terms "Playboy" and "Playmate" should be protected in the situation where a user typing "Playboy" or "Playmate" in a browser search was instead shown advertisements of companies that competed with PEI. This decision reversed an earlier district court ruling. The suit started on April 15, 1999, when Playboy sued Excite Inc. and Netscape for trademark infringement.

Censorship 

Many in the American religious community opposed the publication of Playboy. The Louisiana pastor and author L. L. Clover wrote in his 1974 treatise, Evil Spirits, Intellectualism and Logic, that Playboy encouraged young men to view themselves as "pleasure-seeking individuals for whom sex is fun and women are play things."

In many parts of Asia, including India, mainland China, Myanmar, Malaysia, Thailand, Singapore, and Brunei, sale and distribution of Playboy is banned. In addition, sale and distribution is banned in most Muslim countries (except Lebanon and Turkey) including Iran, Saudi Arabia, and Pakistan. Despite the ban on the magazine in these countries, the official Playboy brand itself can still appear on various merchandise, such as perfume and deodorants.

While banned in mainland China, the magazine is sold in Hong Kong. In Japan, where genitals of models cannot be shown, a separate edition was published under license by Shueisha. An Indonesian edition was launched in April 2006, but controversy started before the first issue hit the stands. Though the publisher said the content of the Indonesian edition will be different from the original edition, the government tried to ban it by using anti-pornography rules. A Muslim organization, the Islamic Defenders Front (IDF), opposed Playboy on the grounds of pornography. On April 12, about 150 IDF members clashed with police and stoned the editorial offices. Despite this, the edition quickly sold out. On April 6, 2007, the chief judge of the case dismissed the charges because they had been incorrectly filed.

In 1986, the American convenience store chain 7-Eleven removed the magazine. The store returned Playboy to its shelves in late 2003. 7-Eleven had also been selling Penthouse and other similar magazines before the ban.

In 1995, Playboy was returned to shelves in the Republic of Ireland after a 36-year ban, despite staunch opposition from many women's groups.

Playboy was not sold in the state of Queensland, Australia during 2004 and 2005, but returned as of 2006. Due to declining sales, the last Australia-wide edition of Playboy was the January 2000 issue.

In 2013, Playboy was cleared by the Pentagon of violating its rule against selling sexually explicit material on military property, but the base exchanges stopped selling it anyway.

In March 2018, Playboy announced that they would be deactivating their Facebook accounts, due to the "sexually repressive" nature of the social media platform and their mismanagement of user data resulting from the Cambridge Analytica problem.

Books
General compilations
 Nick Stone, editor. The Bedside Playboy. Chicago: Playboy Press, 1963.

Anniversary collections
 Jacob Dodd, editor. The Playboy Book: Forty Years. Santa Monica, California: General Publishing Group, 1994, 
 Playboy: 50 Years, The Photographs. San Francisco: Chronicle Books, 2003, 
 Nick Stone, editor; Michelle Urry, cartoon editor. Playboy: 50 Years, The Cartoons. San Francisco: Chronicle Books, 2004. 
 Gretchen Edgren, editor. The Playboy Book: Fifty Years. Taschen, 1995. 

Interview compilations
 G. Barry Golson, editor. The Playboy Interview. New York: Playboy Press, 1981.  (hardcover),  (softcover)
 G. Barry Golson, editor. The Playboy Interview Volume II. New York: Wideview/Perigee, 1983.  (hardcover),  (softcover)
 David Sheff, interviewer; G. Barry Golson, editor. The Playboy Interviews with John Lennon and Yoko Ono. New York: Playboy Press, 1981, ; 2000 edition, 
 Stephen Randall, editor. The Playboy Interview Book: They Played the Game. New York: M Press, 2006,

See also
 :Category:Playboy lists
 Counterculture of the 1960s
 List of men's magazines
 Playboy Bunny
 Playboy Club
 Playboy TV
 Playgirl
 Pubic Wars
 Media
 Playboy's Book of Forbidden Words
 Playboy Dolls
 Playboy: The Mansion

References

External links

Official
 

Others
 Playboy Covers of the World – Thousands of Playboy covers from all past and present editions worldwide.
 Crossett, Andrew, Index: The Women of Playboy – 1967–2010
 Playmate database at the University of Chicagoarchived version June 2008
 A full listing of the Playboy Interview subjects and their interviewers
 Josh Lambert, "My Son, the Pornographer": Jewish Editors at Playboy
 A Playboy's Guide to Hugh Hefner's Chicago, Chicago Tribune

Playboy
1953 establishments in Illinois
2020 disestablishments in California
Defunct magazines published in the United States
American pornographic film studios
Erotica magazines published in the United States
Literary magazines published in the United States
Magazines established in 1953
Magazines disestablished in 2020
Magazines published in Chicago
Magazines published in California
Men's magazines published in the United States
Monthly magazines published in the United States
Obscenity controversies in literature
Playboy magazines
Sexual revolution